Danny Roane: First Time Director is a 2006 comedy film written, directed by and starring Andy Dick, and also starring Jack Black and Mo Collins. This independent production is a documentary mixed with a mockumentary on Dick's struggle on making a film. The film premiered at the 2006 South by Southwest Film Festival, and released to DVD on November 6, 2007.

Plot
After being blackballed from Hollywood because of his drunken antics, Danny Roane, a washed up TV actor, sobers up to direct his first feature film. As the pressure builds, Roane turns to the bottle again and attempts to finish his movie about drug and alcohol abuse. But in his drunken madness, he decides to make the film a musical.

Cast
Andy Dick as Danny Roane
Frankie Muniz as himself
Jack Black as himself
Sara Rue as Charlotte Lewis
Mo Collins as Deidra Fennigan
Ben Stiller as himself
James Van Der Beek as himself
Anthony Rapp as himself
Maura Tierney as herself

References

External links 

2006 films
2006 comedy films
American comedy films
Films about alcoholism
2006 directorial debut films
Lionsgate films
2000s English-language films
2000s American films